Atma or ATMA may refer to:

 Atma (album), a 2011 album by heavy metal band Yob
 ATMA (electronic musician), the performance name of Romanian psytrance artist Andrei Oliver Brasovean 
 Atma, İliç, Turkey
 Atma, Kemah, Turkey
 Atma (tribe), a Kurdish tribe from Turkey
 ATMA Classique, a Canadian record label
 Atma Weapon, a mythical being of pure energy in the video game Final Fantasy VI
 Atme, a village in northern Syria whose name is alternately spelled Atma
 An alternative spelling of Atman, the soul or self in Indian religions
 Atma, a character in the video game Diablo II
 A fictional virus in the Shin Megami Tensei: Digital Devil Saga series

See also
 Atman (disambiguation)